The prehistory of the Levant includes the various cultural changes that occurred, as revealed by archaeological evidence, prior to recorded traditions in the area of the Levant. Archaeological evidence suggests that Homo sapiens and other hominid species originated in Africa (see hominid dispersal) and that one of the routes taken to colonize Eurasia was through the Sinai Peninsula desert and the Levant, which means that this is one of the most important and most occupied locations in the history of the Earth. 
Not only have many cultures and traditions of humans lived here, but also many species of the genus Homo. In addition, this region is one of the centers for the development of agriculture.

Impact of location, climate, routes
Geographically the area is divided between a coastal plain, hill country to the east and the Jordan Valley joining the Sea of Galilee to the Dead Sea. Rainfall decreases from the north to the south, with the result that the northern region of Israel has generally been more economically developed than the southern one of Judah.

At the latest from the Neolithic period onwards, the area's location at the center of three trade routes linking three continents made it the meeting place for religious and cultural influences from Egypt, Syria, Mesopotamia, and Asia Minor:

 A Coastal Route (the "Via Maris"): connecting Gaza and the Philistine coast north to Joppa and Megiddo, travelling north through Byblos to Phoenicia and Anatolia.
 A Hill Route: travelling through the Negev, Kadesh Barnea, to Hebron and Jerusalem, and thence north to Samaria, Shechem, Shiloh, Beth Shean and Hazor, and thence to Kadesh and Damascus.
 The "Kings Highway": travelling north from Eilat, east of the Jordan through Amman to Damascus, and connected to the "frankincense road" north from Yemen and South Arabia.

The area seems to have suffered from acute periods of desiccation, and reduced rainfall which has influenced the relative importance of settled versus nomadic ways of living. The cycle seems to have been repeated a number of times during which a reduced rainfall increases periods of fallow, with farmers spending increasing amounts of time with their flocks and away from cultivation. Eventually they revert to fully nomadic cultures, which, when rainfall increases settle around important sources of water and begin to spend increasing amounts of time on cultivation. The increased prosperity leads to a revival of inter-regional and eventually international trade. The growth of villages rapidly proceeds to increased prosperity of market towns and city states, which attract the attention of neighbouring great powers, who may invade to capture control of regional trade networks and possibilities for tribute and taxation. Warfare leads to opening the region to pandemics, with resultant depopulation, overuse of fragile soils and a reversion to nomadic pastoralism.

Palaeolithic period (1,850,000 - 20,000 years ago)

Lower Paleolithic period (1.85 million – 200,000 years ago) 

The earliest traces of the human occupation in the Levant are documented in Ubeidiya in the Jordan Valley of the Southern Levant (modern-day Israel). An earlier site is found in Dmanisi, Georgia, dated to 1.85–1.78 million years ago suggest the existence of other sites in the Levant which are yet to be found. Stone tools of the Oldowan industry, preceding the Acheulian, were found in the Negev and Syrian deserts and support the presence of pre-Acheulian cultures in the Levantine corridor, but their chronological context cannot be determined.

Ubeidiya - Early Acheulian (c. 1.5 – 1.2 million years ago) 
Ubeidiya is an open site that existed alongside the extinct Lake Ubeidiya whose shores were inhabited by over a hundred Asian and African animal species including mammals (such as Giraffe, Elephant, Deer and Pelorovis), birds, reptiles, amphibians and mollusks. Some of these animals have been hunted by hominins who inhabited the site as evident in cut marks observed on the fossilized bones. The stone tools found in Ubeidiya include handaxes, picks, chopping tools and spheroids. These tools have been attested to the Early Acheulian industry. The tools show preference for specific rock types such as basalt, limestone and flint for specific tool types. This implies a sophisticated understanding of raw materials by the hominins who located and selected them for production. Other stone tool assemblages in the Levant have been attested to the Early Acheulian, but they lack sufficient dating evidence to allow comparison with Ubeidiya's finds. These sites include Abbassieh near the Nile, Evron Quarry and Zihor in Israel and Al-Lataminah in Syria.

Gesher Benot Ya'akov - Large Flake Acheulian (c. 790,000 – 650,000 years ago) 
North of Ubeidiya is the important site of Gesher Benot Ya'akov ("Daughters of Jacob Bridge" – GBW) dated to slightly after . The stone tool assemblage belongs to the "Large Flake" stage of the Acheulian, testifying to an advance knapping technique. GBY provides information on many aspects of the life of its inhabitants: Many large mammal bones were found at the site, primarily elephants that were hunted and butchered by the early humans. Nuts and tools used to crack them, as well as fish bones, were collected. The earliest wooden artifact - a plank with evidence of polishing - was found at the site, as well as one of the earliest traces of fire use. In some of the layers, the organization of living space was observed, with certain activities limited to specific areas at the site.

Late Acheulian (c. 500,000 – 400,000 years ago) 

The late stage of the Acheulian industry is observed in thousands of sites and find spots in the Middle East, though only a few were excavated. Most of the sites did not yield enough datable evidence. Late Acheulian sites and finds are found spread all across the regions of the Levant, including desert regions in modern-day Saudi Arabia, Jordan and Saudi Arabia, primarily associated with oases, as well as the coastal plains and rift valleys of Israel, Lebanon and Syria. This distribution of sites in various regions of different conditions indicates either a more suitable climate in this period (the Chibanian stage of the Pleistocene) or alternatively better human adapting skills. The earliest cave sites also appear in this stage. Unlike the earlier Acheulian industries in the Levant, flint is the primary material used for tool making, with the handaxe being the primary tool. The toolmakers developed different variants of handaxes different in shape and function, which replaced other tools such as cleavers. Some of the most significant assemblages of stone tools are found in Nadaouiyeh (in central Syria), Tabun, Um Qatafa and Ma'ayan Baruch (in Israel). These sites yield an enormous amount of stone tools, reaching several thousands. An important discovery from Lake Ram is a stone pebble with evidence of artificial shaping and polishing, which resembles the body of a woman and thus serves as one of the earliest figurines known.

Middle Paleolithic period 
The Middle Palaeolithic period is represented in the Levant by the Mousterian culture, known from numerous sites (both caves and open-air sites) through the region. The chronological subdivision of the Mousterian is based on the stratigraphic sequence of the Tabun Cave. Middle Paleolithic human remains include both the Neanderthals (in Kebara Cave, Amud Cave and Tabun), and anatomically modern humans (AMH) from Jebel Qafzeh and Skhul Cave.

Upper Paleolithic 

Epi-Palaeolithic period (20,000 - 9,500 BCE)

The Epipalaeolithic period (also known as Mesolithic period) is characterized by significant cultural variability and wide spread of the microlithic technologies. Beginning with the appearance of the Kebaran culture (18,000–12,500 BCE) a microlithic toolkit was associated with the appearance of the bow and arrow into the area.  Kebaran shows affinities with the earlier Helwan phase in the Egyptian Fayyum, and may be associated with a movement of people across the Sinai associated with the climatic warming after the Late Glacial Maxima of 20,000 BCE.  Kebaran affiliated cultures spread as far as Southern Turkey.  The latest part of the period is the time of flourishing of the Natufian culture and development of sedentism among the hunter-gatherers.

Natufian

This culture existed from about 13,000 to 9,800 BCE in the Levant. Numerous archaeological excavations have led to a relatively well defined understanding of these people. Two of the most significant aspects of this culture were their large community sizes and their sedentary lifestyles. Although the Late Natufian experienced a slight reversal in this trend (possibly a result of the cold period known as the Younger Dryas) as their community size shrank and they became more nomadic, it is believed that this culture continued through and was the foundation for the Neolithic Revolution.

Neolithic period

Pre-Pottery and Pottery Neolithic

The Neolithic period is traditionally divided to the Pre-Pottery (A and B) and Pottery phases. PPNA developed from the earlier Natufian cultures of the area. This is the time of the agricultural transition and development of farming economies in the Near East, and the region's first known megaliths (and Earth's oldest known megalith, other than Göbekli Tepe, which is in the Northern Levant and from an unknown culture) with a burial chamber and tracking of the sun or other stars.

In addition, the Levant in the Neolithic (and later, in the Chalcolithic) was involved in large scale, far reaching trade.

Chalcolithic period
Trade on an impressive scale and covering large distances continued during the Chalcolithic (c. 4500–3300 BCE). This is indicative of a very large trade circle reaching as far as the Northern Fertile Crescent at these three Anatolian sites.

The Ghassulian period created the basis of the Mediterranean economy which has characterized the area ever since. A Chalcolithic culture, the Ghassulian economy was a mixed agricultural system consisting of extensive cultivation of grains (wheat and barley), intensive horticulture of vegetable crops, commercial production of vines and olives, and a combination of transhumance and nomadic pastoralism. The Ghassulian culture, according to Juris Zarins, developed out of the earlier Munhata phase of what he calls the "circum Arabian nomadic pastoral complex", probably associated with the first appearance of Semites in this area.

Early and Middle Bronze Age

The urban development of Canaan lagged considerably behind that of Egypt and Mesopotamia and even that of Syria, where from 3,500 BCE a sizable city developed at Hamoukar. This city, which was conquered, probably by people coming from the Southern Iraqi city of Uruk, saw the first connections between Syria and Southern Iraq that some have suggested lie behind the patriarchal traditions.  Urban development again began culminating in Early Bronze Age sites like Ebla, which by 2,300 BCE, was incorporated once again into the Empire of Sargon, and then Naram-Sin of Akkad (Biblical Accad).  The archives of Ebla show reference to a number of Biblical sites, including Hazor, Jerusalem, and a number of people have claimed, also to Sodom and Gomorrah, mentioned in the patriarchal records.  The collapse of the Akkadian Empire, saw the arrival of peoples using Khirbet Kerak Ware pottery, coming originally from the Zagros Mountains, east of the Tigris.  It is suspected by some Ur seals that this event marks the arrival in Syria and Palestine of the Hurrians, people later known in the Biblical tradition possibly as Horites.

The following Middle Bronze Age period was initiated by the arrival of "Amorites" from Syria in Southern Iraq, an event which people like Albright (above) associated with the arrival of Abraham's family in Ur.  This period saw the pinnacle of urban development in the area of Syria and Palestine.  Archaeologists show that the chief state at this time was the city of Hazor, which may have been the capital of the region of Israel.  This is also the period in which Semites began to appear in larger numbers in the Nile delta region of Egypt.

Timeline

See also
History and archaeology articles
 Genetic history of the Middle East
 History of the Levant
 History of ancient Israel and Judah
 History of Palestine
 Levantine archaeology
 Archaeology of Israel
 Names of the Levant
 Near Eastern bioarchaeology
 Prehistoric Asia

Chronologies and timelines
 List of archaeological periods (Levant)
 Time periods in the Palestine region

Sites
 Gilgal I

References

Bibliography

External links
 Joel Ng, Introduction to Biblical Archaeology 2: From Stone to Bronze
 Paul James Cowie, Archaeowiki: Archaeology of the Southern Levant

Canaan
Prehistory of the Middle East
History of the Levant